Terra Alta is a sparsely populated inland comarca (county) in Catalonia, Spain. Its capital is Gandesa. It is also known as Castellania, a name dating back to its medieval status as a fiefdom held by the Order of Knights of the Hospital of St. John of Jerusalem under the Crown of Aragon.

Municipalities

Mountain ranges
Serra de Cavalls
Serra de la Fatarella
Serra de Pàndols
Serra dels Pesells

References

External links 
 Official comarcal web site (in Catalan)
 information about Terra Alta from the Generalitat de Catalunya (in Catalan)

 
Comarques of the Province of Tarragona